Griswold Street is a major north-south street in downtown Detroit, which passes through the city's Financial District lined with many of its most familiar and recognizable structures, such as the Guardian Building and One Woodward Avenue. Griswold Street also passes through the Capitol Park Historic District.

Tour of the buildings

This list below shows the information on the buildings located along Griswold Street. This list starts at Jefferson Avenue (south end), and heads northbound, terminating at Clifford Street.

See also
Detroit Financial District

References

External links

Streets in Michigan
Downtown Detroit
Transportation in Detroit